Pomasia is a genus of moths in the family Geometridae.

Description
Palpi porrect (extending forward), the second joint reaching beyond the short sharp frontal tuft, whereas third joint long and naked. Antennae of male minutely ciliated. Hind tibia with two spur pairs. Forewings with vein 3 from before angle of cell and veins 7 to 9 stalked. Veins 10 and 11 stalked, and vein 10 anastomosing with veins 8,9 to form the areole. Hindwings with vein 3 from before angle of cell. Vein 5 from middle of discocellulars, which are angled and vein 6,7 stalked.

Species
Pomasia denticlathrata Warren, 1893
Pomasia euryopis Meyrick, 1897
Pomasia galastis Meyrick, 1897
Pomasia lacunaria Holloway, 1997
Pomasia lamunin Holloway, 1997
Pomasia luteata Holloway, 1997
Pomasia nuriae Holloway, 1997
Pomasia obliterata (Walker, 1866)
Pomasia parerga Prout, 1941
Pomasia psylaria Guenée, 1857
Pomasia punctaria Hampson, 1912
Pomasia reticulata Hampson, 1895
Pomasia sacculobata Holloway, 1997
Pomasia salutaris Prout, 1929
Pomasia sparsata Hampson, 1902
Pomasia vernacularia Guenée, 1858

Status unclear
Pomasia salvata Prout, 1929 (possibly Lobogonia salvata Prout, 1928)

References

External links

Eupitheciini